Bartholomæus Deichman (9 August 1671 – 13 April 1731) was a Danish/Norwegian clergyman and Bishop.

Deichman was born in Copenhagen, Denmark. He was the son of Carl Deichman  (ca. 1639–1684) and his wife Else Pedersdatter (d. ca. 1675). He took  his Baccalaureate in 1688.  After theological exam in 1690, he studied in  Frankfurt, Leiden and Utrecht. He first served as a chaplain with the Danish military auxiliaries. In 1697, he had secured a clerical position in Copenhagen. He served as Bishop of Viborg from 1700, and Bishop of the Diocese of Oslo from 1713 to 1730. In 1720–1721, he oversaw the beginning stages of the Norwegian church sale for the King.

Personal life
In 1699, he married Else Rosemeyer (ca. 1669–1745), daughter of Carl Rosemeyer (d. 1670) and his wife Anna Pedersdatter (d. 1679). They had six children, three sons and three daughters.  Their son Carl Deichman (1705–1780) was an investor in Fossum Ironworks  and later owner of Eidsfos Verk. Their daughter Margrethe Deichman (1708–1759) was married to Chancellor Herman Løvenskiold (1701-1759), a member of the noble Løvenskiold noble family who owned Borgestad Manor in Gjerpen.

References

Danish Lutheran bishops
Bishops of Oslo
18th-century Norwegian clergy
1671 births
1731 deaths
Clergy from Copenhagen